The 1983–84 Cupa României was the 46th edition of Romania's most prestigious football cup competition.

The title was won by Dinamo București against Steaua București.

Format
The competition is an annual knockout tournament.

First round proper matches are played on the ground of the lowest ranked team, then from the second round proper the matches are played on a neutral location.

If a match is drawn after 90 minutes, the game goes in extra time, if the scored is still tight after 120 minutes, then the winner will be established at penalty kicks.

From the first edition, the teams from Divizia A entered in competition in sixteen finals, rule which remained till today.

First round proper

|colspan=3 style="background-color:#FFCCCC;"|7 December 1983

|-
|colspan=3 style="background-color:#FFCCCC;"|12 February 1984

|-
|colspan=3 style="background-color:#FFCCCC;"|23 February 1984

Second round proper

|colspan=3 style="background-color:#FFCCCC;"|3 March 1984

Quarter-finals

|colspan=3 style="background-color:#FFCCCC;"|20 March 1984

|-
|colspan=3 style="background-color:#FFCCCC;"|18 April 1984

Semi-finals

|colspan=3 style="background-color:#FFCCCC;"|11 May 1984

Final

References

External links
 romaniansoccer.ro
 Official site
 The Romanian Cup on the FRF's official site

Cupa României seasons
1983–84 in Romanian football
Romania